Child Actor is an American duo consisting of Max Heath and Natalie Plaza.

History
Child Actor was formed by cousins Max Heath and Sedgie Ogilvy. They released the Partner EP in February 2012 and the Window EP in July 2012.

Their first album, Victory, was released on Fake Four Inc. on October 16, 2012. Don Yates of KEXP-FM described the album as "an impressive set of maximalist, R&B-tinged electro-pop with a huge, lush sound featuring walls of glittering synths, hip hop-influenced rhythms, chopped samples, wispy vocals and sugary pop melodies." Alyce Currier of Earmilk said, "With more emotional staying power than a lot of music caught up in today's rapid release cycle, I think this one is a keeper."

Ogilvy left Child Actor in December 2012 with Natalie Plaza taking her place.

Child Actor released their sophomore album, Never Die, in September 2014, followed by A Perfect Cloud in 2016.

More recently, the duo has been active in hip-hop, contributing production to artists such as Open Mike Eagle, serengeti, billy woods, Armand Hammer, and Moor Mother.   

In 2021 Child Actor released an album with frequent collaborator Televangel entitled Respawn via Fake Four Inc.

Discography

Albums
 Victory (2012)
 Never Die (2014)
 A Perfect Cloud (2016)
 Respawn with Televangel (2021)

EPs
 Partner (2012)
 Window (2012)
 Promise (2013)
 Siempre Mia with Televangel (2020)

Guest appearances
 Dark Time Sunshine – "Valiant" and "Forget Me Not" from Anx (2012)
 Blue Sky Black Death – "This Is It" and "Can't Take It With Me When I Die" from Cliff of Death EP with Deniro Farrar (2012)
 Sadistik – "Palmreader" from Flowers for My Father (2013)
 Deniro Farrar – "Death Or Forever" and "Croisade" from The Patriarch II (2013)
 Blue Sky Black Death – "I" and "II" from Glaciers (2013)
 Deniro Farrar – "Rebirth/Hold On" from Rebirth (2014)
 Sadistik – "Orange" from Ultraviolet (2014)
 serengeti – "Never Fall Back" from Energy EP (2019)

Production
 Busdriver – "Utilitarian Uses of Love (Child Actor remix)" from Beaus$Eros (Deluxe Version) (2012)
 Ceschi – "Work Song" from Forgotten Forever (2014)
 serengeti – Energy EP (all songs, 2019)
 billy woods – "Shepherd's Tone (feat. Fielded)" from Terror Management (2019)
 Armand Hammer – "Charms (feat. Keiyaa)" from Shrines (2020)
 Moor Mother and billy woods – "Rapunzal", "Blak Forrest ft. Fielded", "Tiberius ft. ELUCID", and "Portrait ft. Navy Blue" from BRASS (2020)
 Fielded – "Justus ft. billy woods (Child Actor remix)" from The Sherita Sessions: Demisexual Lovelace Remixes (2021)
 ELUCID – "Spellling", "Old Magic", "Mangosteen feat. billy woods", and "Split Tongue" from I Told Bessie (2022)
 ShrapKnel - "Running Rebel Swordplay", "Obol", and "A Tribe All Stressed" from Metal Lung (2022)
 AKAI SOLO - "Sun 2 Moon" from Body Feeling (2022)
 Amani & Robalu - "Starchild" from I'll Be Right Black! (2022)
 serengeti – AJAI 2 (all songs, 2022)
 Open Mike Eagle - "The Song With The Secret Name", "I Retired Then I Changed My Mind", and "Peak Lockdown Raps" from Component System with the Auto Reverse (2022)

References

External links
 
 Child Actor on Fake Four Inc.

American pop music groups
American contemporary R&B musical groups
American musical duos
Musical groups established in 2012
2012 establishments in the United States